Padrón peppers, also called Herbón peppers, are a landrace variety of peppers (Capsicum annuum) from the municipality of Padrón in northwestern Spain.

Characteristics 
Padrón peppers are small, about 2 inches (5 cm) long and have an elongated shape. They are often picked, sold and eaten unripe, when they are still green. The taste is mild, but some exemplars can be quite hot. This property has given rise to the popular Galician aphorism "Os pementos de Padrón, uns pican e outros non" ("Padrón peppers, some are hot, some are not"). Drought-stressed plants tend to produce hotter peppers. Like several other peppers, Padrón peppers become spicier as they mature. Their ripe colour is red.

Cultivation 
The species Capsicum annuum is native to southern North America, the Caribbean, and northern South America where it was domesticated. The Padrón pepper variety originates from the municipality of Padrón in the province of A Coruña, Galicia, northwestern Spain. European Union law has protected the name "pemento de Herbón" as a protected designation of origin since 2010. Padrón peppers are now also grown elsewhere in the Mediterranean and in the United States. 

Padrón peppers are picked when immature and green.

Culinary preparation 
Padrón peppers are customarily fried in olive oil until the skin starts to blister and the pepper collapses. 

In and around the town of Padrón, the stems are removed before frying. Removing the stems is recommended by major Galician pepper producers and the head of the Galician tourism association on the grounds that they cause bitterness in fried peppers. Elsewhere, the stems are generally left on the peppers, and the stems are used to hold the peppers while eating.

Fried Padrón peppers are typically served hot with a dusting of coarse salt, sometimes accompanied by chunks of bread, as tapas.

See also 
List of Capsicum cultivars
Shishito, a very similarly used pepper in Japan

References

Capsicum cultivars
Chili peppers
Galician cuisine
Province of A Coruña
Tapas